Alexander Potyomkin (1675–1746) was a Russian nobleman. He was the father of Grigory Potyomkin. He died on 2 June 1746.

Family
About 1708, he married an unknown woman, whom he divorced in 1724.

In 1723, he married Daria Vasilievna Kondyreva (1704–1780). It was a second marriage for both of them. They had six children:

Marfa Yelena (1724–1775) – married Wasilij von Engelhardt and had six daughters, the famous Potemkin Nieces,
Marya – married Nikołaj Samojłow, 
Piełagieja – married Peter Wysocki, 
Daria – married Alexander Lichaczow,
Nadzieżda (1738–1757) – unmarried,
Grigory Alexandrovich Potyomkin (1739–1791).

Russian nobility
1675 births
1746 deaths